Pisoni is a surname. Notable people with the surname include:

Adam Pisoni, American entrepreneur 
David Pisoni (born 1963), Australian politician
Ferruccio Pisoni (1936–2020), Italian politician
Gaetano Matteo Pisoni (1713–1782), Italian architect
Jim Pisoni (1929–2007), American baseball player
Pier Giacomo Pisoni (1928–1991), Italian historian, paleographer and archivist

See also 
Pisoni Vineyards and Winery, is a family-owned and operated vineyard and winery located in the Santa Lucia Highlands of California’s Monterey Coast